The following is a list of transfers involving Israeli football clubs during the 2009 Summer break. For Winter 2009–10 transfers, see List of 2009–10 Israeli football winter transfers.

Bnei Yehuda

In
 Aviv Haddad - from Hakoah Amidar Ramat Gan
 Ran Kadoch - from Barnet F.C.
 Omri Afek - from Maccabi Haifa
 George Amsis - from Gadna Tel Aviv Yehuda
 Siniša Linić - from Hajduk Split

Out

 Milan Martinović - free agent 
 Kobi Moyal - to Beitar Jerusalem
 Shai Nissim - to Beitar Jerusalem
 Hrvoje Kovačević - to Hapoel Ramat Gan
 Eli Abarbanel - to Hapoel Petah Tikva
 Tomer Hemed - to Maccabi Ahi Nazareth
 Aviran Dalal - to Hapoel Bnei Lod
 Tamir Cahlon - to Maccabi Tel Aviv

Bnei Sakhnin

In
 Cadu - From Hatta Club
 Bogdan Apostu - From Nyíregyháza Spartacus
 Amir Abu Arar - from Hakoah Amidar Ramat Gan
 Reuven Oved - free agent

Out
 Yehiel Tzagai - free agent
 Oshri Gita - to Hapoel Acre 
 Okocha - to Maccabi Netanya
 Yaniv Luzon - to Maccabi Ahi Nazareth

Beitar Jerusalem

In

 Kobi Moyal - return from loan from Bnei Yehuda
 Junior Viza - return from loan from Hapoel Petah Tikva
 Avi Reikan - return from loan from Hapoel Petah Tikva
 Hen Azriel - return from loan from Hapoel Petah Tikva
 Joslain Mayebi - from Hakoah Amidar Ramat Gan
 David Gomez - from Hapoel Jerusalem F.C.

Out
 Dario Fernandez - to  Aris Thessaloniki F.C.
 Tvrtko Kale - to Hapoel Be'er Sheva
 Michael Zandberg - to Hapoel Tel Aviv
 Nir Nachum - to F.C. Ashdod
 David Amsalem - retired

F.C. Ashdod

In
 Ori Uzan - from Hapoel Petah Tikva
 Barak Badash - from Hakoah Amidar Ramat Gan
 Nir Nachum - from Beitar Jerusalem
 Idan Wiezman - from Hakoah Amidar Ramat Gan
 Israel Rosh - from Hakoah Amidar Ramat Gan
 Gal Levy - from Hakoah Amidar Ramat Gan
 Shay Revivo - from Hapoel Ramat Gan

Out
 Shay Holtzman - retired
 Kobi Dajani - to Hapoel Petah Tikva
 Amir Lavi - to Hapoel Ra'anana
 Rahamim Tzukul - free agent
 Shai Maimon - loan return to Maccabi Haifa
 Lubomír Kubica - Inter Baku
 David Revivo - from Hapoel Be'er Sheva
 Yossi Ofir - from Hapoel Be'er Sheva

Hapoel Acre

In

 Emmanuel Emangoa - from Maccabi Kiryat Ata
 Eitan Azaria - from Maccabi Herzliya
 Gad Amos - from Maccabi Haifa
 Itzhak Cohen - from Hapoel Petah Tikva
 Oshri Gita - from Bnei Sakhnin
 Israel Zviti - from Ironi Nir Ramat HaSharon
 Sharon Goramzano - from Hapoel Ra'anana

Out
 Bryan Gerzicich - to Hapoel Haifa
 Alon Ziv - to Ahva Arraba  
 Rafi Sarusi - free agent 
 Shlomi Edri - free agent 
 Omar Abdul Aziz - free agent 
 Ronen Schwartzman - to Ahva Arraba 
 Tomer Tayar - free agent

Hapoel Be'er Sheva

In
 Tvrtko Kale - from Beitar Jerusalem
 Erez Mesika - from AEK Larnaca
 Eyal Shen - from Hapoel Petah Tikva
 Danilo - from Wuhan Guanggu
 Shimon Harush - from Maccabi Ahi Nazareth
 Pathé Bangoura - from Olimpik Baku
 Joseph Tachie - from Accra Hearts of Oak SC
 Siraj Nasser - from Maccabi Kafr Kanna
 Pavel Pergl - from Dynamo Dresden
 Lior Asulin - from Maccabi Petah Tikva
 David Revivo - from F.C. Ashdod
 Yossi Ofir - from F.C. Ashdod

Out
 Ofir Haim - to Maccabi Herzliya
 Liron Zarko - to Chongqing Lifan
 Igor Costrov - to Maccabi Herzliya
 Zohar Hogeg - Ironi Bat Yam
 Dudi Fadlon - free agent
 Junstine Zulu - to Hapoel Kfar Saba
 Leandro Simioni - free agent
 Asi Rahamim - retired
 Oren Nisim - to Hapoel Ironi Nir Ramat HaSharon
 Rafi Amos - to Maccabi Be'er Sheva
 Roy Sabag - to Hapoel Ironi Nir Ramat HaSharon

Hapoel Haifa

In

 Bryan Gerzicich - From Hapoel Acre
 Eden Ben Basat - From Hapoel Tel Aviv
 Emmanuel Pappoe - From AEK Larnaca
 Ahmad Diab - From Bnei Tamra

Out
 Irakli Geferidze - to AEP Paphos
 Hamudi Kial - free agent
 Dudu Avraham - Ahva Arraba
 Ran Rol - Ahva Arraba

Hapoel Petah Tikva

In
 Kobi Dajani - from F.C. Ashdod
 Elnatan Salami - from Hapoel Kfar Saba
 Amir Lavi - from F.C. Ashdod
 George Gebro - from Budapest Honvéd
 Emmanuel Mathias - from Espérance
 Udi Hanoun - from Hapoel Ironi Nir Ramat HaSharon
 Eli Abarbanel - from Bnei Yehuda
 Tomo Barlecaj - from FC Winterthur
 Osman Bashiru - from King Faisal Babes

Out
 Shimon Abuhatzira - to Larissa F.C.
 Ori Uzan - to F.C. Ashdod
 Eyal Shen - to Hapoel Be'er Sheva
 Avi Reikan - to Beitar Jerusalem
 Hen Azriel - to Beitar Jerusalem
 Junior Viza - to Beitar Jerusalem
 Jair Céspedes - to Maccabi Ahi Nazareth
 Shavit Elimelech - retired
 Yossi Rosen - Hapoel Ashkelon
 M'peti Nimba - Hapoel Ironi Kiryat Shmona
 Raphael Maltinsky - free transfer

Hapoel Ra'anana

In

 Tamir For - from Hakoah Ramat Gan
 Haim Pontramoli - from Hakoah Ramat Gan
 Avi Soffer - from Hapoel Ramat Gan
 Omri Atia - from Hapoel Marmorek
 Amir Lavi - from F.C. Ashdod
 Itay Elkaslasi - from Hapoel Kfar Saba
 Barak Daniel - from Ironi Kiryat Ata
 Lira - from Hapoel Kfar Saba

Out
 Haim Malka - to Hapoel Ramat Gan
 Breitner Morte de Carvalho - free agent 
 Akiva Megrelashvili - free agent 
 Jonathan Tennenbaum - to Hapoel Ironi Nir Ramat HaSharon
 Tarek Abbas - to Maccabi Ahi Nazareth
 Sharon Goramzano - to Hapoel Acre
 Lior Linder - to Hapoel Nazareth Illit
 Orel Edri - to Hakoah Amidar Ramat Gan

Hapoel Ramat Gan

In
 Golan Hermon - from Maccabi Netanya
 Haim Malka - from Hapoel Ra'anana
 Serge Ayeli - from Maccabi Ahi Nazareth
 Benni Haddad - from Hakoah Amidar Ramat Gan
 Hrvoje Kovačević - from Bnei Yehuda
 Ben Luz - from Hapoel Tel Aviv
 Amit Ohana - from Ironi Rishon LeZion
 Omer Peretz - from Ironi Kiryat Shmona

Out

 Avi Soffer - to Hapoel Ra'anana
 Moshe Abutbul - free agent
 Roni Ohana - free agent
 Kobi Shriki - Hapoel Kfar Saba 
 Shay Revivo - to F.C. Ashdod

Hapoel Tel Aviv

In
  Boris Klaiman -  Hapoel Kfar Saba - free transfer 
  Dedi Ben Dayan -  Maccabi Netanya - undisclosed fee
  Michael Zandberg -  Beitar Jerusalem - free transfer
  Zurab Menteshashvili -  FK Ventspils - undisclosed fee
  Itay Shechter -  Maccabi Netanya for $500,000
  Nemanja Vucicevic -  FC Köln - free transfer

Out

  Yigal Antebi -  Maccabi Netanya F.C. - free transfer 
  Elin Topuzakov -  PFC Levski Sofia - free transfer
  Dimitar Telkiyski -  FC Amkar Perm - free transfer
  Ben Luz -  Hapoel Ramat Gan - free transfer
  Reuven Oved -  Bnei Sakhnin - free transfer
  Boris Klaiman -  Maccabi Herzliya - loan 
  Galil Ben Shaanan -  Hapoel Haifa - loan
  Lior Bakshi -  Hapoel Petah Tikva - loan
  Manzour Amar -  Sektzia Nes Tziona - loan
  Cfir Dar -  Hapoel Petah Tikva - loan
  Itai Elkaslasi -  Hapoel Ra'anana - loan
  Lior Asulin -  Hapoel Be'er Sheva - loan
  Idan Srur -  - Hapoel Petah Tikva - loan

Maccabi Ahi Nazareth

In

 Tomer Hemed - from Maccabi Haifa
 Mor Dahan - from Maccabi Haifa
 Anderson West - from Maccabi Haifa
 Ismayil Amar - from Maccabi Petah Tikva
 Ruslan Nigmatullin - from FC Lokomotiv-2 Moscow
 Jair Céspedes - from Hapoel Petah Tikva
 Yakir Shina - from Maccabi Tel Aviv
 Yaniv Luzon - from Bnei Sakhnin

Out
 Serge Ayeli - to Hapoel Ramat Gan
 Tom Almadon - free agent
 Eliran Hudeda - Hapoel Nazareth Illit
 Ram Seti - free agent
 Haim Silvas - to Ahva Arraba

Maccabi Haifa

In
 Yero Bello - return loan from Ironi Kiryat Shmona
 Vladimir Dvalishvili - from Skonto FC
 Jorge Teixeira - from AE Paphos
 Shai Maimon - return loan from F.C. Ashdod

Out

 Ronnie Gafney - to Maccabi Tel Aviv
 Tomer Hemed - to Maccabi Ahi Nazareth
 Mor Dahan - to Maccabi Ahi Nazareth
 Anderson West - to Maccabi Ahi Nazareth
 Gad Amos - to Hapoel Acre
 Omri Afek - to Bnei Yehuda
  Leonard Krupnik - to New York Red Bull
 Ransford Osei - on loan to FC Twente
 Thembinkosi Fanteni - to Orlando Pirates F.C.

Maccabi Netanya

In

 Achmad Saba'a - from Bnei Lod
 Reef Messika - from Ironi Ramat Hasharon
 Maoz Samya - from Hapoel Kfar Saba Until September 2009
 Hen Ezra - from Hapoel Kfar Saba
 Alon Weisberg - from Hakoah Amidar Ramat Gan
  Firas Mugrabi - from youth team
 Okocha - return from loan Bnei Sakhnin
 Yigal Antebi - from Hapoel Tel Aviv

Out

 Luis Marin - to L.D. Alajuelense
 Alberto Zapata - to Alianza FC
 Alberto Blanco - to San Francisco
 Golan Hermon - to Hapoel Ramat Gan
 Siyabonga Nkosi - to Supersport United
 Liran Strauber - to Maccabi Tel Aviv
 Dedi Ben Dayan - to Hapoel Tel Aviv
 Avi Knafo - to Hapoel Ra'anana
 Itay Shechter - to Hapoel Tel Aviv
 Gal Nir - to Hapoel Ironi Nir Ramat HaSharon
 Ze'ev Haimovich - to Terek Grozny
 Maoz Samya

Maccabi Petah Tikva

In
 Dan Roman - from Maccabi Tel Aviv
 Avi Yehiel - from Maccabi Tel Aviv
 Tomislav Bušić - from Hajduk Split
 Morad Abu-Anza - from Bnei Lod
 Vančo Trajanov - from Chernomorets Burgas

Out
 Boban Grncarov - to APOEL Nicosia
 Ismayil Amar - to Maccabi Ahi Nazareth
 Shlomo Tzemah - to Hapoel Ironi Kiryat Shmona
 Lior Asulin - Bnei Sakhnin
 Liran Cohen - free agent
 Avi Ivgi - Hapoel Nazareth Illit
 Pablo Bastianini - free agent

Maccabi Tel Aviv

In
 Yuval Avidor - from Ironi Kiryat Shmona
 Ronny Gafney - from Maccabi Haifa
 Liran Strauber - from Maccabi Netanya
 Tamir Cahlon - from Bnei Yehuda
 Andrej Komac - from  Djurgårdens IF

Out
  Jonathan Assous - free agent
 Dan Roman - to Maccabi Petah Tikva
 Dulee Johnson - to AIK Solna
 Avi Yehiel - to Maccabi Petah Tikva
 Moshe Mishaelof - to Apollon Limassol
 Dragoslav Jevrić - free agent
 Scott Sealy - free agent
 Haim Megrelashvili - to Vitesse Arnhem
 Yakir Shina - to Maccabi Ahi Nazareth

See also
 2009–10 Israel State Cup
 2009–10 Toto Cup Al

Notes and references

Israeli
Transfers
2009-2010
Association football player non-biographical articles